The Northern straight-mouth nase (Pseudochondrostoma duriense) is a species of ray-finned fish in the family Cyprinidae.
It is found in Portugal and Spain.
Its natural habitat is rivers.
It is threatened by habitat loss.

References

 

Pseudochondrostoma
Fish described in 1985
Taxonomy articles created by Polbot